Muziwenkosi Hadebe (born 1948) widely known as Langalibalele II is the reigning King of the Hlubi people of South Africa. The Hlubi people are still contesting for the official recognition of their kingship and nation by South African government..

Further reading

References

Living people
1948 births
21st-century monarchs in Africa
People from KwaZulu-Natal
Hlubi kings